Bilobata torninotella is a moth in the family Gelechiidae. It was described by Anthonie Johannes Theodorus Janse in 1954. It is found in South Africa.

The wingspan is about 10 mm. The hindwings are deep grey.

References

Endemic moths of South Africa
Gelechiinae
Moths described in 1954